Tom Bierschenk (born 13 July 2002) is a German professional footballer who plays as a forward for  club Hallescher FC.

References

External links

2002 births
Living people
German footballers
Association football forwards
1. FC Magdeburg players
Hallescher FC players
3. Liga players